Eva-Lena Jansson (born 1963) is a Swedish social democratic politician. She has been a member of the Riksdag since 2006.

External links

Eva-Lena Jansson at the Riksdag website

Members of the Riksdag from the Social Democrats
Living people
1963 births
Women members of the Riksdag
21st-century Swedish women politicians